Young, James and Webster v United Kingdom [1981] ECHR 4 is a UK labour law case, concerning freedom of association and the closed shop. It found that the closed shop was incompatible with the convention, although it does not prevent fair share agreements, or automatic enrollment in union membership with an opt-out.

Facts
British Rail signed a union membership agreement with unions so that all employees would have to join one union.

Judgment
A majority of the European Court of Human Rights held that a closed shop could violate the Convention if (1) there was an obligation to make existing and not just new employees union members (2) where membership would violate other ECHR rights, especially article 9 and 10, and where (3) the obligation was underpinned by dismissal from employment. There were situations where article 11(2) could be fulfilled, but this was not one of them.

Mr Sørensen, joined by Mr. Thór Vilhjálmsson and Mr. Lagergren dissented.

See also

UK labour law

Notes

References
Sorensen and Rasmussen v Denmark [2006] ECHR 24
E McGaughey, A Casebook on Labour Law (Hart 2019) ch 8, 396

United Kingdom labour case law
European Court of Human Rights cases involving the United Kingdom
1981 in British law
1981 in case law